Thomas Trevarthan (birth unknown – death unknown) was a New Zealand rugby union and professional rugby league footballer who played representative rugby league (RL) for New Zealand.

His brother, David, represented New Zealand in rugby union. He is also related to William Trevarthen, a member of the 1907-08 All Golds.

Playing career
Trevarthan originally played rugby union for North Otago.

In 1936 he moved to Auckland and switched codes, joining the Manukau rugby league club. That same year Trevarthan was selected to represent Auckland and played in two test matches for New Zealand against Great Britain.

References

Auckland rugby league team players
Manukau Magpies players
New Zealand national rugby league team players
New Zealand rugby league players
New Zealand rugby union players
North Otago rugby union players
Place of birth missing
Place of death missing
Rugby league centres
Rugby league five-eighths
Year of death missing
1910 births